Zhi (Wade-Giles chih) is a hanyu pinyin transliteration of many Chinese characters. It may refer to:

 Zhì (智), "wisdom", a virtue in the philosophy of Mencius (book)
 Zheng Zhi (郑智), a footballer
 Zhi (surname) (支)
 Zhi (excrescences) (芝), a term related to mushrooms and Daoism
 Ground (Dzogchen), transliterated gzhi or zhi, in Tibetan Buddhism